Gusheh-ye Pol (also Romanized as Gūsheh-ye Pol, Gūshehpal, and Gūsheh Pol) is a village in Dorud Rural District, in the Central District of Dorud County, Lorestan Province, Iran. At the 2006 census, its population was 397, in 90 families.

References 

Towns and villages in Dorud County